The Dargaville Branch is a branch line railway that leaves the North Auckland Line not far south of Whangarei and runs westward to Dargaville. Construction of this relatively short line took approximately two decades, and when it was completed, it linked the now closed Donnellys Crossing Section with the national rail network. The branch has been closed to all traffic since 2014 and is currently used by a tourist railcart operation.

Construction

The Dargaville Branch was built relatively late in comparison to most railway lines in New Zealand. Construction from Waiotira on the North Auckland Line commenced in 1922.  Dargaville, however, was not reached for another eighteen years. The first twenty-two kilometres through unstable country took six years to build, with the line not opened to Kirikopuni until 15 May 1928.  In January 1931, the line was open to Tangowahine, sixteen kilometres from Dargaville, but construction ceased for five years due to the Great Depression.  In 1940, trains commenced running to Dargaville, but the old railway station (used by the Donnellys Crossing Section) was closed and a new station built at a different location, delaying the formal opening of the Dargaville Branch until 15 March 1943, over twenty years after construction began.

Initially, a railway from Kirikopuni north to Kaikohe was proposed, but by 1928 when there was a line from Whangarei this proposal was discarded. However the line was initially constructed with a balloon loop into the town of Kirikopuni, two kilometres north of the direct line to Dargaville, as a result of pressure from the local MP and Prime Minister Gordon Coates. A bypass eliminated the loop in 1943.

Operation
From its opening until March 1967, mixed trains carrying both passengers and freight ran to connect with passenger services on the North Auckland Line - the Northland Express (Auckland-Opua and return) until November 1956, and then the 88 seater railcars (Auckland-Okaihau and return). After March 1967, the line carried freight only.

In December 1998, a major derailment damaged a major section of the track and closed the line. For the first six months of 1999 the line remained closed while Tranz Rail reviewed the line, as one of the biggest customers (Northland Dairy Company's dairy factory in Dargaville) was also due to close in 2000. Tranz Rail reopened the line in June 1999 with logs being the primary business.

A daily return train was scheduled from Monday to Friday but it only ran when required. It takes roughly three hours both ways; the service to Dargaville arrived in the mid-morning and departed before lunch, arriving in Whangarei in the mid-afternoon.

October 2014 closure

In late October 2014 KiwiRail staff were told the line was closed until further notice. The loading contractor responsible for the loading of rail wagons, Forest Loaders, were also informed and all remaining wood stock will be removed by road. Earlier the line was shut for a number of months due to a washout, the line was repaired but the only activity after the repair was the removal of all stranded rail wagons.

In 2015, a tourist railcart service began using the branch line.

Motive power
Typical motive power on the Dargaville Branch from its opening until the mid-1960s were steam locomotives of the AB and J classes. When the line was dieselised, DA class diesel-electrics took over and worked the line until 1988. In 2000 the sole remaining DJ class locomotive was allocated to Whangarei to work the line. The DBR class and DC class locomotives comprised the typical motive power from then until the closure of the line in 2014.

See also
North Auckland Line
Donnellys Crossing Section/Branch
Marsden Point Branch
Ōkaihau Branch
Onerahi Branch
Opua Branch

References

Citations

Bibliography

External links
Photos -
First train and Pukehuia station in 1927
First train over Wairoa Bridge in 1927
Pukehuia station in 1973
Kirikopuni station in 1973
Tangowahine station in 1973

Railway lines in New Zealand
Kaipara District
Railway lines opened in 1943
Rail transport in the Northland Region
Dargaville